Ahmed Sameer Mohammad Saleh is a Jordanian footballer who plays as a midfielder for Al-Wehdat and the Jordan national football team.

International career
Samir's first match with the Jordan national senior team was against Uzbekistan in an international friendly in Amman on 13 August 2012, which Jordan lost 1–0.

International goals

With U-22

With Senior
Scores and results list Jordan's goal tally first.

International career statistics

References

External links 
 
 

Living people
Jordanian footballers
Jordan international footballers
Association football midfielders
Sportspeople from Amman
Al-Ramtha SC players
Al-Jazeera (Jordan) players
Al Urooba Club players
Al-Wehdat SC players
1991 births
UAE First Division League players
Expatriate footballers in the United Arab Emirates
2019 AFC Asian Cup players